Pepita Emmerichs is an Australian musician and actress. She co-founded the music group Oh Pep! with Olivia Hally, and appeared in the 2009 film Where the Wild Things Are.

Life and career
Pepita "Pepi" Emmerichs was born and raised in Melbourne, Australia. She attended the Victorian College of Arts Secondary School, where she began collaborating with fellow student Olivia Hally in 2009. Emmerichs and Hally later co-founded the band Oh Pep!, whose musical style Emmerichs has characterised as "folk/pop/country with bluegrass instrumentation".

Emmerichs also appeared in Spike Jonze's 2009 film Where the Wild Things Are, in which she played Claire, the protagonist's older sister.

Filmography

References

External links

Living people
Australian film actresses
Australian child actresses
Actresses from Melbourne
Year of birth missing (living people)
Australian country singers